Arkansas Highway 11 (AR 11 and Hwy. 11) is a designation for three state highways in Arkansas. One segment of  runs from US Route 63 (US 63) at Pansy to Huff Island Public Use Area near Grady. A second segment of  begins just across the Arkansas River at the eastern terminus of Highway 88 at Reydell and runs north to US 65 west of De Witt. A third route of  runs from Interstate 40 (I-40) and US 63 in Hazen north to Highway 367 in Searcy.

One segment of the original Arkansas Highway 11 from the state highway system's creation in 1926 has been listed on the National Register of Historic Places (NRHP) in Arkansas County.

Route description

Pansy to the Arkansas River

AR 11 begins in Cleveland County at US 63 in Pansy and runs east. The continues northeast upon entering Lincoln County, intersecting US 425/AR 45 in Star City. AR 11 has a  business route in Star City. AR 11 runs east until Fresno, when it turns north and meets US 65 in Grady. After Grady, the route runs north to Huff's Island Public Use Area, where it terminates.

Reydell to Eldridge Corner
The route begins at AR 88 in Jefferson County and runs east. Upon entering Arkansas County, the route is crossed by AR 276. AR 11 runs north to terminate at US 165/AR 152 at Eldridge Corner.

Hazen to Searcy
AR 11 begins at US 63 by Interstate 40 exit 193. The route runs north untin forming a  concurrency with AR 38 east to Des Arc. Continuing north into White County, AR 11 runs through Griffithville and Higginson before terminating at AR 367 at the southern limits of Searcy.

History
Arkansas Highway 11 formerly continued past its current southern terminus. The route went south to Hazen, and continued south into Arkansas County as early as 1935 and as late as 1992. Most of the route was paved by 1963.

Kauffman Road segment
It is listed on the National Register of Historic Places. The segment was the main automobile route in its part of Arkansas County from the time of its construction around 1916 until it was bypassed in 1955 by a new alignment (now US 165).

Major intersections
Mile markers reset at concurrencies.

Special routes

Star City business route

It is known as Jefferson Street.

Former Hazen spur

It was replaced by U.S. Route 63 Spur when AR 11 was truncated at I-40 north of Hazen. The US 63S designation was subsequently removed in 2008, converting the road to a city street.

See also

 List of state highways in Arkansas
 National Register of Historic Places listings in Arkansas County, Arkansas

References

External links

Roads on the National Register of Historic Places in Arkansas
011
Transportation in Arkansas County, Arkansas
Transportation in Cleveland County, Arkansas
Transportation in Jefferson County, Arkansas
Transportation in Lincoln County, Arkansas
Transportation in Prairie County, Arkansas
Transportation in White County, Arkansas
National Register of Historic Places in Arkansas County, Arkansas